This is a list of notable Basque people. For this purpose, people considered are those hailing from the extended Basque Country (includes the Basque Autonomous Community, the French Basque Country and Navarre).

In particular 
 born or resident in the Basque Country, unless self-identifying as not Basque (e.g. people self-identifying as Spanish or French rather than Basque.)
 people born outside the Basque Country of Basque ancestry that either speak Basque or self-identify as being of Basque stock.
This list does not contain people outside the Basque Country who happen to have one or more Basque surnames. For people of Basque ancestry in general, please see People with Basque ancestors.

Artists

Astronauts
 Léopold Eyharts, astronaut.

Business people

 Dominique Amestoy, banker, founder of Farmers and Merchants Bank.
 José María Arizmendiarrieta, founder of the Mondragón cooperatives.
 John Arrillaga, real estate businessman, Silicon Valley.
 John Ascuaga, businessman, owner of John Ascuaga's Nugget Casino Resort.
 Jacques Bergerac, actor, and business executive with Revlon.
 François Cabarrus, adventurer and Spanish financier.
 John Etchemendy
 Cristina Garmendia
 José Ignacio Goirigolzarri, president of Bankia.
 Roberto Goizueta, chief executive officer of Coca-Cola.
 Simón Iturri Patiño, business magnate.
 Casilda Iturrizar, businessperson and philanthropist.
 Jacques Laffitte, banker and politician.
 Miguel Leonis
 Elías Querejeta, screenwriter and film producer.
 Joseph A. Unanue, businessman, president of Goya Foods.
 Enrique Zobel y de Ayala, Filipino industrialist, patriarch of the Zobel de Ayala family.

Chefs
 Karlos Arguiñano
 Juan Mari Arzak
 Nieves Barragán Mohacho
 Martin Berasategui
 Luis Irizar

Clergy

Educators
Elbira Zipitria (1906–1982), innovative Spanish-Basque educator promoting use of the Basque language

Explorers

Historical figures

Journalists

Military figures

Models
 Garbiñe Abasolo
 Lorena Bernal
 Yolande Betbeze
 Jon Kortajarena
 Sheila Marquez
 Agnès Souret

Musicians

Philosophers

Political figures

Scientists

Sportspeople

Writers

Notes

References

 Pierson, Peter (1999). The History of Spain. Westport, Connecticut: Greenwood Publishing Group. .
 Trask, Robert Lawrence (1997). The History of Basque. London: Routledge. 

 
 
Basque
Basque